Charlevoix—Saguenay was a federal electoral district in Quebec, Canada, that was represented in the House of Commons of Canada from 1925 to 1949.

This riding was created in 1924 from parts of Charlevoix—Montmorency and Chicoutimi—Saguenay ridings.

It initially consisted of the Counties of Charlevoix-East, Charlevoix-West and Saguenay, l'Isle-aux-Coudres, the territories of Ashuanipi and New Quebec, the Island of Anticosti and the County of Montmorency No. 1, excluding the municipalities of St. Jean de Boischatel, L'Ange Gardien and Ste. Brigitte de Laval.

In 1933, it was redefined to consist of
 the counties of Charlevoix-East and Charlevoix-West and l'Ile aux Coudres;
 the county of Saguenay and the Island of Anticosti;
 the county of Montmorency No. 1, excepting the parts included in the municipalities of St-Jean-de-Boischatel and L'Ange-Gardien; and
 the territory of New Quebec.

The district was abolished in 1947 when it was redistributed into Charlevoix and Saguenay ridings.

Members of Parliament

This riding elected the following Members of Parliament:

Election results

By-election: On Mr. Casgrain accepting an office of emolument under the Crown, 15 December 1941.

See also 

 List of Canadian federal electoral districts
 Past Canadian electoral districts

External links
Riding history from the Library of Parliament

Former federal electoral districts of Quebec